Stanley Urban is an American former ice dancer. With Sally Schantz, he won the 1963 U.S. Championships, and later won a further two medals at the U.S. Championships competing with his sister Susan Urban.

Urban, who was from Buffalo, New York, was a student at Boston College at the time he competed with Schantz.  They were unable to defend their national title in 1964 because Urban was injured playing intramural football and had his leg in a cast for seven weeks.  Schantz decided to turn professional at that time to take a coaching position.  The following season, Urban returned to competition partnered with his sister Susan.

Results
(with Wilma Piper)

(with Sally Schantz)

(with Susan Urban)

References

Boston College alumni
American male ice dancers
Living people
Year of birth missing (living people)
Sportspeople from Buffalo, New York